The Jönköping Concert Hall is a concert hall in Jönköping, Sweden. It was opened in September 1990.

There are two halls, the Hammaskjöld Hall and the Rydberg Hall.

References

External links

Programbolaget 

1990 establishments in Sweden
Buildings and structures in Jönköping
Music venues completed in 1990
Concert halls in Sweden
Culture in Jönköping